Harrisburg is an unincorporated community in Harrison Township, Fayette County, Indiana.

History
A post office was established at Harrisburg (then spelled Harrisburgh) in 1828, and remained in operation until it was discontinued in 1902.

Geography

References

Unincorporated communities in Fayette County, Indiana
Unincorporated communities in Indiana